The Polish Democratic Society ( or TDP) was a radical constitutionalist political organization established in Paris by émigrés from the Kingdom of Poland in 1832. While not explicitly socialist with respect to their political program, the Democratic Society nonetheless was influenced by French Utopian socialist thinking of the era and advocated the right of citizens to own land or other means of production.

The Polish Democratic Society continued in existence into the decade of the 1840s, when it was a leading voice for agrarian revolution in Galicia. It is recognized as a forerunner of the Polish socialist movement which culminated in the establishment of the Communist Party of Poland.

Organizational history

Establishment
The Polish Democratic Society (TDP) was established in the Kingdom of Poland in March 1832. The first program of the TDP, a so-called "Small Manifesto," was adopted on March 17, 1832, in Paris by a pair of the group's founders, Tadeusz Krępowiecki and Aleksandr Puławski. These individuals traced their organizational roots to earlier activity in the Polish National Committee established in 1831.

Program

The TDP argued for the need of drastic reforms in reconstituted Poland and published an official newspaper, Demokrata Polski (The Polish Democrat). The group gained support for its cause through its official slogan, "Everything by the People and for the People."

In 1846, some members of the Polish Democratic Society participated in the Kraków uprising. Other notable activists included Stanisław Worcell and Ludwik Mierosławski.

Termination

The TDP was eventually disbanded in 1862.

See also 
 Association of the Polish People

Footnotes

1832 establishments in Poland
1862 disestablishments in Europe
1830s in Poland
Great Emigration
1840s in Poland
Political parties established in 1832
Political parties disestablished in 1862